Quiun Qeshlaqi (also Romanized as Qūīūn Qeshlāqī; also known as Qīūn Qeshlāq and Qīun Qeshlāqī) is a village in Qaranqu Rural District, in the Central District of Hashtrud County, East Azerbaijan Province, Iran. At the 2006 census, its population was 412, in 88 families.

References 

Towns and villages in Hashtrud County